The Symphony No. 85 in B major, Hoboken I/85, is the fourth of the six Paris symphonies (numbers 82–87) written by Joseph Haydn. It is popularly known as La Reine (The Queen).

Background 

The 85th Symphony was completed in either 1785 or 1786. It made its way to America early on, at first through a keyboard arrangement such as one played by Nelly Custis at the White House.

Nickname (La Reine) 
The nickname La Reine originated because the work was a favorite of Marie Antoinette, at the time Queen of France. It is the only one of the Paris symphonies whose nickname is of 18th-century origin.

Movements 

The symphony is in standard four movement form and is scored for flute, two oboes, two bassoons, two horns, and strings.

Adagio — Vivace
Romance: Allegretto
Menuetto: Allegretto
Finale: Presto

The first movement contains a reference to Symphony No. 45. The second movement is described by H. C. Robbins Landon as "a set of variations on the old French folk-song 'La gentille et jeune Lisette'; see Haydn and folk music.

See also
List of symphonies by name

Notes

References
Robbins Landon, H. C. (1963) Joseph Haydn:  Critical Edition of the Complete Symphonies, Universal Edition, Vienna
Steinberg, Michael (1995) The Symphony: A Listeners Guide.  Oxford University Press.
Harrison, Bernard Haydn: The "Paris" Symphonies (Cambridge University Press, 1998)
 Kirk, Elise K. Music at the White House: A History of the American Spirit (University of Illinois Press, 1986)

Symphony 085
Compositions in B-flat major
1785 compositions
1786 compositions